Echeta divisa is a moth of the family Erebidae. It was described by Gottlieb August Wilhelm Herrich-Schäffer in 1855. It is found in Peru and Colombia.

References

Phaegopterina
Moths described in 1855